Eric T. Hill is a retired United States Air Force major general who last served as the deputy commander of the Air Force Special Operations Command. Prior to that, he was the commanding general of the Special Operations Joint Task Force-Operation Inherent Resolve.

Maj Gen Hill has been a key figure in the United States Air Force Special Operations Command's search for seaplanes capabilities.

References 

Living people
Year of birth missing (living people)
Place of birth missing (living people)
United States Air Force generals
Major generals